The 2022 Swiss Indoors was a men's tennis tournament to be played on indoor hard courts. It was the 51st edition of the event, and part of the 500 series of the 2022 ATP Tour. It was held at the St. Jakobshalle in Basel, Switzerland, from |r through 30 October 2022. It was the first edition of the event since 2019, with the 2020 and 2021 editions cancelled due to the border restrictions in the French and German borders on the COVID-19 pandemic.

Champions

Singles

  Félix Auger-Aliassime def.  Holger Rune, 6–3, 7–5

Doubles

  Ivan Dodig /  Austin Krajicek def.  Nicolas Mahut /  Édouard Roger-Vasselin, 6–4, 7–6(7–5)

Singles main draw entrants

Seeds

 Rankings are as of 17 October 2022

Other entrants
The following players received wildcards into the singles main draw:
  David Goffin 
  Marc-Andrea Hüsler 
  Dominic Stricker 

The following player received entry as a special exempt:
  Mackenzie McDonald

The following player received entry using a protected ranking into the main draw:
  Stan Wawrinka

The following players received entry from the qualifying draw:
  Laslo Đere 
  Ugo Humbert 
  Arthur Rinderknech 
  Roman Safiullin

The following player received entry as a lucky loser:
  Aslan Karatsev

Withdrawals
  Sebastian Korda → replaced by  Aslan Karatsev
  Nick Kyrgios → replaced by  Jack Draper

Doubles main draw entrants

Seeds

 Rankings are as of 17 October 2022

Other entrants
The following pairs received wildcards into the doubles main draw:
  Marc-Andrea Hüsler /  Dominic Stricker 
  Jérôme Kym /  Leandro Riedi 

The following pair received entry from the qualifying draw:
  Andrey Golubev /  Aleksandr Nedovyesov

The following pair received entry as lucky losers:
  Nathaniel Lammons /  Jackson Withrow

Withdrawals
  Nick Kyrgios /  Pedro Martínez → replaced by  Nathaniel Lammons /  Jackson Withrow

References

External links

2022 ATP Tour
2022
2022 in Swiss sport
Swiss Indoors